Josep Pedrals i Urdàniz (Barcelona, 13 January 1979) is a Spanish poet and rhapsodist. He is a personality in the world of poetry reading in the Catalan Countries. He has also contributed to various mass media, including the Avui newspaper, Catalunya Ràdio or the magazines El Temps, Paper of Vidre and Bossa Nova. In the music dimension, in 2007 he carried through the hip-hop show Endoll, along with Guillamino. Before he had acted with "Explosión Bikini" and he is currently working with the band Els Nens Eutròfics.

Published work 
Poetry
Escola italiana. Barcelona: Ed. 62, 2003
El furgatori. Cornellà de Llobregat: LaBreu, 2006
En/doll. Castellar del Vallès: LaBreu, 2007, with Guillamino
El Romanço d'Anna Tirant. Castellar del Vallès: LaBreu, 2012
 Qui no mereix una pallissa (con Melcior Comes, Pere Antoni Pons y Jordi Rourera)
 
Represented plays
Puaj!. Reus: Teatre La Palma, 2005
Wamba va! (with Eduard Escofet, Martí Sales Sariola). Barcelona: Mercat de les Flors, 2005
En comptes de la lletera. Barcelona: La Seca. Espai Brossa, 2012
El Furgatori. Barcelona: La Seca. Espai Brossa, 2012

Literary awards 
Premi Lletra d'Or, 2013: El Romanço d'Anna Tirant
 Ciutat de Barcelona Award, 2018: Els límits del Quim Porta

References

External links 
 Official web

Writers from Barcelona
Catalan-language poets
1979 births
Living people